Radim Nečas (born 12 January 1988) is a Czech footballer who plays for FK Pardubice, on loan from FK Dukla Prague. He has represented his country at under-21 level.

Career

Early career
Nečas made his Gambrinus liga debut for Slavia Prague in August 2006 as a substitute in a match against Teplice. He went on to make a total of four league appearances for Slavia, all as a substitute.

Nečas joined Mladá Boleslav from Slavia in January 2007, signing a four-year contract.

Having failed to make a single league appearance for Boleslav in his first year, Nečas moved to Czech 2. Liga side Dukla Prague on loan in January 2008. Nečas did not make his league debut for Boleslav until August 2008, when he appeared as a substitute against Sparta. He made a total of seven league appearances for Boleslav, all as a substitute, in the 2008–09 Gambrinus liga.

The following season, Nečas played just 20 minutes of first-team football before the end of the year, coming on as a substitute against Baník Ostrava. He moved on loan to Slovácko in February 2010 until the end of the season, where he made five appearances including his first Gambrinus liga start. During this time he also made his debut for the Czech Republic under-21 team. However, he was one of eight players released by Slovácko at the end of the season.

Dukla
In July 2010, Nečas moved to Dukla permanently. In the 2010–11 season Nečas was limited to seven league appearances, all as a substitute. However, he did score his first goal for Dukla in April 2011 against Sparta Prague B after coming on as a 54th-minute substitute. Dukla finished the season as winners of the 2010–11 Czech 2. Liga and were promoted to the Gambrinus liga.

In the first half of the 2011–12 Gambrinus liga, Nečas found it difficult to break into the starting line up, making just two substitute appearances. In the winter break he moved to Vlašim on loan for the remainder of the season.

Personal life
He is the son of Radim Nečas, a former national team player.

References

External links
 
 
 Radim Nečas player profile, Dukla Prague

1988 births
Living people
Czech footballers
Czech Republic youth international footballers
Czech Republic under-21 international footballers
Association football forwards
SK Slavia Prague players
FK Mladá Boleslav players
FK Dukla Prague players
1. FC Slovácko players
FC Sellier & Bellot Vlašim players
Czech First League players